Conasprella levenensis is a species of sea snail, a marine gastropod mollusc in the family Conidae, the cone snails, cone shells or cones.

Distribution
This marine species occurs in the Indian Ocean off Madagascar.

References

 Monnier E. & Tenorio M.J. (2017). New cones from North-West Madagascar (Gastropoda: Conidae) / Nouveaux cones du Nord-Ouest de Madagascar (Gastropoda: Conidae). Xenophora Taxonomy. 17: 32-40. page(s): 35 [English text], 40 [French text], pl. 2 figs 4-5

levenensis
Gastropods described in 2017